The National Harbor–Alexandria Line, designated as Route NH2, is a daily bus route operated by the Washington Metropolitan Area Transit Authority between King Street–Old Town station of the Blue and Yellow Lines of the Washington Metro and National Harbor via the Woodrow Wilson Bridge. The line operates every 30 minutes at all times. NH2 trips are roughly 30 minutes. This line provides service to National Harbor and MGM National Harbor from Alexandria, Virginia via the Woodrow Wilson Bridge at Capital Beltway (I-495). It is the only Metrobus route that operates via the bridge and the only current Metrobus route that connects Maryland and Virginia by bus.

Route description and service

Background 
The NH2 was created as a plot route on October 23, 2016 due to high demand. The route would be a plot for nine months and if successful, the NH2 would become a permanent route in 2017. The route is funded by National Harbor developer Peterson Companies, the City of Alexandria, Fairfax County and the Maryland Department of Transportation in a unique public/private partnership. The route has since become permanent by July 2017.

The NH2 operates between 5:00 AM with the last bus leaving at 12:00 AM every 30 minutes. The NH2 operates buses out of Shepherd Parkway division.

Stops

History 
National Harbor opened on April 1, 2008 with the opening of the Gaylord National Resort & Convention Center and has since got more attractions like Tanger Outlets and the Capital Wheel. With the opening of the new Woodrow Wilson Bridge, it could handle capacity for any future Washington Metro line that'll connect to National Harbor. However, there were no plans to build any lines over the bridge. Instead, the state of Maryland pays $312,000 annually for the NH1 to National Harbor from the Southern Avenue station on the Green Line. The NH1 would begin service on March 23, 2008.

In June 2008, Gaylord National Resort and Convention Center have asked Maryland to fund for additional transit service since employees found it difficult to reach National Harbor. In 2011, Metro began considering the possibility of building a rail extension to National Harbor off the Green Line as part of its long-term plan. In 2013, it was proposal for the NH1 to serve King Street station and alternative service would be provided by TheBus 35 with the NH1 serving Southern Ave during late nights.

Introduction of the NH2 
On October 23, 2016, WMATA implemented the NH2 as a nine-month test plot due to high demand. 
The NH2 is the first route to provide service across the reconstructed Woodrow Wilson Bridge, the first route since the former N11 & N13 that ran between King Street station and Branch Avenue/Suitland stations that were discontinued on June 26, 2004.

Prior to the NH2, passengers would have to travel via the Yellow Line to L'Enfant Plaza station. Then they'll have to transfer onto a Branch Avenue bound Green Line train to Southern Avenue station to catch the NH1. Passengers can use the NH2 without having to travel through Washington, D.C. and instead travel via the Bridge. Before the NH2 came into service, National Harbor only had two bus routes heading into National Harbor. Besides the already running NH1, National Harbor also had TheBus 35 and 35S. However the 35 would only serve Gaylord Hotel while the 35S would only operate Weekdays only and only have a total of six trips (3 in the morning and 3 in the afternoon between 9:00-3:20 only running every hour and 15 minutes). National Harbor used to have Metrobus NH3 which would be replaced by the NH1 when it was rerouted back to Southern Ave.

With the introduction of the NH2, the route will fill the demand from passengers running in Alexandria Virginia to National Harbor.

Changes 
Beginning on September 9, 2018, the St George Blvd & Waterfront St bus stop in National Harbor was discontinued and the NH2 along with the NH1 were rerouted to follow straight on National Harbor Blvd, turn right on Waterfront Street, and make a right turn onto St. George Blvd where it'll serve its current stop at Waterfront St & Potomac Passage. The reason WMATA made the reroute was since of traffic congestion along Downtown National Harbor (Waterfront St) and wanted to offer customers a more efficient trip. However it meant that both the NH1 & NH2 only served one stop at National Harbor.

During WMATA's 2020 Fiscal Year budget, it was proposed for the NH2 to be shorten to King Street–Old Town station only and discontinue service to Huntington station as it overlaps both the Yellow Line and the Richmond Highway Express. However the frequency for buses will decrease from 30 to 40 minutes everyday with post-midnight trips being eliminated.

In response to the COVID-19 pandemic route NH2 began operating on its weekend schedule beginning on March 16, 2020 with weekend service being suspended. All route NH2 was temporarily suspended on June 28, 2020 due to the route having low ridership following reduced service, and low demand at National Harbor. WMATA announced to restore the NH2 service on August 23, 2020 as part of the Metro's COVID-19 Recovery Plan, with some minor changes of the route. Service between King Street–Old Town station and Huntington station was eliminated as the NH2 overlaps with the Yellow Line and Richmond Highway Express. Although, the NH2 will still serve Eisenhower Avenue station following these changes.

On September 26, 2020 as part of its FY2022 proposed budget, WMATA proposed to eliminate all weekend route NH2 service in order to reduce costs and low federal funds. However on March 14, 2021, all weekend service on route NH2 was restored operating on its pre-pandemic schedule.

References 

NH2